Clement Argwings Ogaja (Kenya, 1972) is a Kenyan author and research geodesist at the National Oceanic and Atmospheric Administration. Previously, he was a professor of geomatics engineering at California State University, Fresno, having also worked at Geoscience Australia in Canberra.

Education and career 
He earned his BSc (First Class) in Surveying (Geomatics) from the University of Nairobi in 1997, before moving to Australia where he studied for a PhD at UNSW Sydney. He completed his PhD in 2002, working on structural health monitoring of engineering structures, such as bridges and high-rise buildings, using global positioning system. 

After his PhD, Ogaja worked at Geoscience Australia before joining California State University, Fresno in 2007 as an assistant professor. He also worked for GPS companies and wrote books and articles on GPS and geomatics engineering.

Notable works

References

External links
 

1972 births
Living people
University of Nairobi alumni
Kenyan Luo people
Kenyan expatriates in the United States
University of New South Wales alumni
Technology writers
Geodesists
Surveyors
21st-century Kenyan people